The Dean of Chelmsford is the head (primus inter pares – first among equals) and chair of the Cathedral Chapter, the governing body of Chelmsford Cathedral, the Cathedral Church of St Mary the Virgin, St Peter and St Cedd.  Before 2000 the post was designated as a provost, which was then the equivalent of a dean at most English cathedrals. The cathedral is the mother church of the Diocese of Chelmsford and seat of the Bishop of Chelmsford. The Dean of Chelmsford is also responsible for the Chapel of St Peter-on-the-Wall at Bradwell-on-Sea, founded by St Cedd, among the oldest church buildings in regular use in England.

The current Dean is Nicholas Henshall.

List of provosts and deans

Provosts
1929–1949: William Morrow
1949-1951: Charles Waller
1951–1966: Eric Gordon
1966–1977: Connop Price
1978–1981: Dick Herrick
1982–1996: John Moses
1997–2000: Peter Judd (became Dean)

Deans
20006 October 2013: Peter Judd
6 October 20132 February 2014: Ivor Moody, Vice Dean (Acting)
2 February 201423 February 2023 (res.): Nicholas Henshall (returned to parish ministry)

References

Deans of Chelmsford
Deans of Chelmsford
 
Deans of Chelmsford